A Club Championship system is a sports competition where more than one team is fielded by clubs in the competition. An example of its use is in club rugby and cricket competitions in Australia where clubs may have several grades.

A club championship is useful because it allows a comparison of the entire club's strength against another, rather than merely looking at, for example, first grade results. Because it allows a comparison of the entire club's strength, club championships are often used where there is a promotion/relegation system in place.

This means that a club which is strong throughout the grades will be in a better position than one which has only one or two strong teams. In a club championship system each grade's results are weighted, with the higher grades receiving more points, preventing clubs from flooding their lower grades with top players at the end of a season and shoring up their club championship results.

See also

 New South Wales Suburban Rugby Union
 Sydney Grade Cricket

References

Tournament systems